Macrocoma aeneonigra is a species of leaf beetle of Algeria, described by Léon Fairmaire in 1873.

References

aeneonigra
Beetles of North Africa
Beetles described in 1873
Taxa named by Léon Fairmaire